Shikohabad  Assembly constituency is one of the 403 constituencies of the Uttar Pradesh Legislative Assembly, India. It is a part of the Firozabad  district and one of the five assembly constituencies in the Firozabad Lok Sabha constituency. First election in this assembly constituency was held in 1952 after the "DPACO (1951)" (delimitation order) was passed in 1951. After the "Delimitation of Parliamentary and Assembly Constituencies Order" was passed in 2008, the constituency was assigned identification number 98.

Wards / Areas 
Extent  of Shikohabad Assembly constituency is KCs Firozabad & Matsaina of  Firozabad Tehsil; PCs Makkhanpur, Mohanipur, Mohammadpur Labbhoua, Dakhinara,  Aasdevmai Nurpur, Dikhtoli, Shikohabad, Aronj, Nawali, Sadhupur, Mohammadpur  Ahir, Armrajat, Rasulpur, Harganpur, Hariya, Abbaspur, Amri of Shikohabad KC  & MB Shikohabad of Shikohabad Tehsil.

Members of the Legislative Assembly

Election results

2022

See also 
 Firozabad district
 Firozabad Lok Sabha constituency
 Sixteenth Legislative Assembly of Uttar Pradesh
 Uttar Pradesh Legislative Assembly
 Vidhan Bhawan

References

External links 
 

Assembly constituencies of Uttar Pradesh
Shikohabad
Constituencies established in 1951